Khalileh Sara may refer to:
 Khalileh Sara, Astara
 Khalileh Sara, Talesh